The 2022 Maine House of Representatives elections took place on November 8, 2022 alongside the biennial United States elections. Maine voters elected members of the Maine House of Representatives via instant-runoff voting in all 151 of the state house's districts, as well as a non-voting member from the Passamaquoddy Tribe.

The election was also held alongside elections for the Maine Senate.

State representatives serve two-year terms in the Maine State House.

Summary of results
Italics denote an open seat held by the incumbent party, bold text denotes a gain for a party. 

Sources:

Notes

References 

House of Representatives
Maine House of Representatives
Maine House of Representatives elections